"She Thinks His Name Was John" is a song written by Sandy Knox and Steve Rosen, and recorded by American country music icon Reba McEntire.  It was released in July 1994 as the second single from her album Read My Mind.  Upon its release, the song gained media attention and controversy for its storyline, regarding a woman who was dying from AIDS.

Content
"She Thinks His Name Was John" tells the story of a woman who is dying from AIDS, which she acquired after becoming intoxicated and having a one-night stand with a man whom she did not previously know. The song recounts how, upon learning she has contracted AIDS, she struggles to remember the man with whom she had her affair; she cries herself to sleep over dreams and life's milestones she will never experience, (such as marriage and motherhood); and how former friends pity her because of the decision that led to her illness.

Sandy Knox, one of the song's writers, was inspired to write "She Thinks His Name Was John" after losing her brother to the disease. The song was released as a single after several radio stations began playing it as an album cut.

Chart performance

References

1994 singles
1994 songs
Reba McEntire songs
Song recordings produced by Tony Brown (record producer)
Country ballads
MCA Records singles
Songs about HIV/AIDS